Jasminka Guber (born 10 August 1985) is a Bosnian middle-distance runner. She competed in the women's 1500 metres at the 2004 Summer Olympics.

References

1985 births
Living people
Athletes (track and field) at the 2004 Summer Olympics
Bosnia and Herzegovina female middle-distance runners
Olympic athletes of Bosnia and Herzegovina
Place of birth missing (living people)